Galatos Peak is a peak,  high, that marks the northwestern extremity of Salamander Range in the Freyberg Mountains of Victoria Land, Antarctica. The topographical feature was so named by the northern party of the New Zealand Geological Survey Antarctic Expedition, 1963–64, after Galatos, a village in Crete associated with Lord Freyberg and the 2nd New Zealand Expeditionary Force during World War II. The peak lies situated on the Pennell Coast, a portion of Antarctica lying between Cape Williams and Cape Adare.

References

Mountains of Victoria Land
Pennell Coast